The MCW Light Heavyweight Championship was a professional wrestling light heavyweight championship owned by the Maryland Championship Wrestling (MCW) promotion. The title was created and debuted on July 19, 1998 at a MCW live event.

The inaugural champion was Shane Shamrock, who defeated Christian York, Joey Matthews, Mark Schrader, Quinn Nash, and Earl the Pearl in a Six Way match on July 19, 1998 win at an MCW live event to become the first and only champion.

Title history

References
General

Specific

External links
MarylandWrestling.com

MCW Pro Wrestling championships